Vilar do Paraíso is a former civil parish in the municipality of Vila Nova de Gaia, Portugal. In 2013, the parish merged into the new parish Mafamude e Vilar do Paraíso. The population in 2011 was 13,878, in an area of 5.30 km².

Heritage 
 Chapel of Saint Martin (Capela de São Martinho)

References 

Former parishes of Vila Nova de Gaia